The National Transmission Corporation (TransCo) is a Philippine government-owned and controlled corporation created in 2001 by the Electric Power Industry Reform Act (Republic Act 9136) and a corporate entity wholly owned by the Power Sector Assets and Liabilities Management (PSALM). It is the owner of the country's power grid and its related assets and facilities since March 1, 2003, and also served as operator of the grid from March 2003 until the turnover of the grid's operations and maintenance to the privately owned National Grid Corporation of the Philippines (NGCP) on January 15, 2009. As owner of the transmission facilities, it assumed all of National Power Corporation's (NAPOCOR) substation and transmission assets. TransCo is also responsible for protecting the national government's interests by monitoring NGCP's compliance with the standards set by its concession agreement with NGCP, congressional franchise and other relevant laws, handle existing cases such as right-of-way (portion of a power line) and lands where the transmission structures stand acquired and designated, structures built, and other claims that were accrued prior to the turnover of operations and maintenance of the power grid to NGCP on January 15, 2009, divest remaining sub-transmission assets to technically and financially qualified electric distributors nationwide, and undertake the operations, maintenance, consultancy and other technical services for the Philippine Economic Zone Authority (PEZA) and Authority of the Freeport Area of Bataan (AFAB). It is also in charge of administering the FIT to renewable power generators.

History

2001–2003: Creation and turnover of operations, maintenance and ownership of the power grid from NAPOCOR to TransCo
President Gloria Macapagal Arroyo signed RA 9136 (Electric Power Industry Reform Act), which introduced market competition in the energy sector and mandated the creation of TransCo on June 8, 2001. TransCo was started as a unit of another government-owned corporation named National Power Corporation (NAPOCOR), with NAPOCOR continued to own, operate, and maintain the country's power grid and its related assets and facilities until March 1, 2003.

TransCo's System Operations (SO) Group obtained an ISO 9001:2000 Certification where it is the first SO group in the Southeast Asia to obtain the said certification in 2001.

In October 2002, Gloria Macapagal Arroyo proved a plan to privatize TransCo through a 25-year Operation and Management Concession Agreement.

TransCo took over the operations, maintenance, and ownership of the country's power grid from NAPOCOR on March 1, 2003, with Dr. Alan T. Ortiz became the first TransCo president to serve after the turnover of operations, management, and ownership of the grid from NAPOCOR to TransCo. Its transmission lines links various power plants, distribution utilities (such as Manila Electric Company), and electric cooperatives.

2003–2009: TransCo as power grid operator
TransCo served as power grid operator from March 1, 2003, until the turnover of operations and maintenance of the grid to National Grid Corporation of the Philippines (NGCP) on January 15, 2009.

In September 2004, Power Sector Assets and Liabilities Management (PSALM) received but rejected proposals from four groups with different offers for the TransCo contract that eventually led to a decision to conduct a public bidding.

In June 2005, TransCo garnered the fifth highest score in the Corporate Governance Scorecard for GOCCs & GFIs in the field of Corporate Governance from the Institute of Corporate Directors (ICD).

On September 22, 2005, PSALM filed at the Energy Regulatory Commission (ERC) a petition for a regulatory reset of the maximum annual revenue for TransCo and other concessionaires. From 2003 to 2006, three auctions failed mostly as a result of issues regarding regulatory framework and right-of-way.

In January 2006, TransCo wrote history by bagging the Philippine Quality Award Recognition for Commitment to Quality Management.

In August 2006, TransCo's implementation of Spatial Data Infrastructure Project received a Special Achievement in Geographic Information System (GIS) Award, conferred by the Environmental Systems Research Institute, Inc. (ESRI) in California, United States.

2007–2009: Transition period for the turnover of operations and maintenance from TransCo to NGCP to start of concession period or turnover to NGCP
On December 12, 2007, 2 consortia bid for a 25-year license to run the Philippine power grid – privatization of the management of TransCo: the consortium of Monte Oro Grid Resources Corp., comprising the State Grid Corporation of China, and Calaca High Power Corp., won in an auction conducted by the Power Sector Assets and Liabilities Management (PSALM) Corp. as it submitted the highest offer of $3.95 billion, for the right to operate TransCo for 25 years, outbidding San Miguel Energy, a unit of San Miguel Corporation (bid of $3.59 billion), Dutch firm TPG Aurora BV and Malaysia's TNB Prai Sdn Bhd. Jose Ibazeta, PSALM president and CEO remarked: “We are very happy about the successful turnout of the bidding for TransCo. PSALM handled the privatization of the government’s transmission business with utmost transparency and judiciousness."

On February 28, 2008, TransCo's concession agreement with NGCP was executed and became effective.

TransCo bagged the Mother Nature Award where it is given annually to companies that demonstrate effective compliance with environmental regulations and those that design and successfully implement sound Environmental Management System (EMS) and Environmental Management Programs (EMP) beyond mere compliance with existing laws in 2008.

Congress approved bicameral resolution granting franchise to NGCP to manage and operate its transmission facilities nationwide in November 2008.

President Gloria Macapagal Arroyo signed RA 9511 into law granting franchise to NGCP in December of that same year.

On January 15, 2009, TransCo turned over the operations, maintenance, and management of the transmission system to NGCP which marked the start of the 25-year concession period and renewable for another 25 years with a total of 50 years. Ownership of the country's power grid, however, remains with the Philippine government through TransCo.

2009–present: TransCo after the turnover of operations and maintenance to NGCP
TransCo assumed its new role as a result of turnover of operations and maintenance to NGCP on January 15, 2009, which was to protect the national government's interest by ensuring NGCP's compliance with the terms and conditions of its concession agreement with NGCP, policies of the Department of Energy (DOE) and other relevant laws, handle existing cases, divest the remaining sub-transmission assets, and administer the Feed-in-Tariff Allowance Fund for renewable energy generators. Arthur N. Aguilar continued to serve as TransCo president even after its operations and maintenance of the power grid was transferred to NGCP on January 15, 2009, until he was replaced by Moslemen T. Macarambon, Sr. six months later on July 16, 2009, as a result of taking a new oath of office of the new table of TransCo organization.

The Department of Budget and Management approved the new structure of TransCo consequent to the privatization of its transmission business on April 20, 2009.

The new table of organization employees took a new oath of office on July 16, 2009, which results in the formation of a new TransCo.

In November 2012, ERC named TransCo as fit-allowance fund administrator and was given an added role in renewable energy sector.

On March 24, 2017, TransCo receives its ISO certification for Quality Management System from TÜV Rheinland.

On June 8, 2018, the Department of Information and Communications Technology (DICT), NGCP, and TransCo signed an agreement on Friday for a national broadband plan that will help accelerate internet connectivity nationwide. Under the agreement, the DICT will utilize TransCo's reserved optical fiber to distribute connectivity from Luzon to Mindanao using the submarine cables that will be laid down by Facebook from the United States to Asia. The agreement plans to expand the internet connectivity in public places for free by building an additional 200,000 access points nationwide by 2022, DICT Officer-In-Charge Eliseo Rio said.

In 2022, the Presidential Communications Operations Office (PCOO) presented the Certificate of Compliance to TransCo for meeting the necessary requirements pursuant to Section 5.7.b of Memorandum Circular No. 2020–1 on the Harmonization of National Government Performance, Monitoring, Information, and Reporting Systems.

In January 2022, TransCo  has succeeded in testing and applying emerging ICT technologies that will make use of existing power line infrastructures to help the Department of Education (DepEd) to implement the Public Education Network program of DepEd that will provide connectivity and high-speed internet to public schools nationwide amid the pandemic. TransCo president Melvin Matibag said the Public Education Network-Communications Infrastructure for Learning (PEN-CIL) project would address the challenges of DepEd in ensuring the continuity of learning amid the pandemic and the expected transition to the New Normal by providing Internet connectivity in all public schools.

In May 2022, TransCo and Palawan Electric Cooperative (PALECO) signed a memorandum of agreement (MOA) mandating the corporation to perform all functions of Small Grid System Operator to address the lingering power issues in Palawan. Said MOA signing is in accordance with the Department of Energy (DOE) Department Circular No. 2021-11-0039 “Mandating the National Transmission Corporation as Small Grid System Operator in Specific Areas."

Controversies with NGCP
In May 2017, TransCo accused NGCP with violating its concession agreement with the power grid operator by supposedly making too much money from its operations of the country's electricity grid. Executive Secretary Salvador Medialdea pointed out that, if indeed NGCP had violated the terms of its contract by profiting unduly from the operations of the power grid such as allowing telecommunications firms to mount their fiber optic cables on the transmission towers.

In a November 2019 session, the Senate of the Philippines was informed that Chinese part ownership of the National Grid Corporation of the Philippines – the Philippines sole power transmission line company – gave China the power to remotely switch off the Philippine electrical grid. Senator Sherwin "Win" Gatchalian said that he was advised by the president of TransCo that it was possible for China to shut down the Philippine electrical grid remotely "given the technological advancement right now in the telecommunications as well as in software." Gatchalian also said it would "take about 24 to 48 hours, depending on the gravity, to bring the grid back up."

Senator Richard "Dick" Gordon raised security concerns about the Philippines having "given our grid – although 40% it appears – to a foreign corporation that has interests that collide with our country in the West Philippine Sea," given that China "obviously has a hegemonic ambition."

In 2021, the National Association of Electricity Consumers for Reforms, Inc. (NASECORE) has called on the Energy Department to conduct a systems audit of NGCP for what it called a “dismal failure” of the grid operator “to ensure the quality, reliability, security and affordability of the supply of electric power” as required by law. In a letter to Energy Secretary Alfonso Cusi dated December 21, 2021, NASECORE said: “This failure had been repeatedly witnessed during the 2013 Super Typhoon Yolanda, Typhoon Ruby in 2014 and the earthquake of 2017 due to its apparent inadequate, weak and grossly unreliable transmission system that are easily felled by typhoons.” NASECORE President Pete Ilagan said this performance of NGCP is unacceptable and unfair to electric cooperatives and distribution utilities who bear the brunt of the blame from consumers for the grid operators’ weak and the unreliable transmission system. NASECORE urged the Energy Department conduct an immediate and transparent audit (an actual ocular inspection and documentation) of NGCP transmission system so as to determine the required upgrading and improvisation that will establish a resilient transmission system nationwide and ERC to conduct a regulatory audit of the funds it provided NGCP meant specifically for Capital Expenditures which covers the rehabilitation and upgrading of the nationwide transmission system. Ilagan added that the concession agreement of NGCP with TransCo should be reviewed for possible violations as well as a review of NGCP's congressional franchise by the Joint Congressional Energy Commission (JCEC) to protect public interest.

Organization
Below is a table listing the officials of TransCo which are appointed by the President of the Philippines. The TransCo organization consists of president and CEO serving as head of the government agency, secretaries of Departments of Finance, Energy and Environment and Natural Resources, with DOF secretary serving as ex officio chairman, representatives for Luzon, Visayas and Mindanao, Corporate Secretary and Compliance Officer, and Vice Presidents for General Counsel, Right-of-Way and Legal Group, Management Transmission Group and Resource Management Services Group. The DOF, DOE and DENR secretaries, TransCo president and CEO, Luzon, Visayas and Mindanao representatives, and Corporate Secretary and Compliance Officer form the TransCo board of directors.

Presidents

Chairman
The Department of Finance secretary serves as ex officio chairman of TransCo which is appointed by the President of the Philippines.

Notes

See also
List of Philippine companies
National Grid Corporation of the Philippines
National Power Corporation

References

External links

Official website

Government-owned and controlled corporations of the Philippines
Companies based in Quezon City
Department of Energy (Philippines)
Electric power companies of the Philippines
2001 establishments in the Philippines
Energy companies established in 2001